Lastlings are an Australian electronic pop band from Gold Coast, Queensland made up of brother and sister duo Amy and Josh Dowdle. They have performed at Coachella, Spilt Milk, Splendour in the Grass, and The Plot. The duo are well known for their song "Deja Vu", which received high rotation on triple j. Lastlings supported Two Door Cinema Club on their  Australian national tour.

Career
The project began while Amy was in high school; at the time Josh was studying biomedical science and working in fashion, from the age of 8 he studied classical music. Drummers Dave Jenkins and 
Shane Benson are interchangeably added to the band's lineup for live performances.

In 2017 Lastlings embarked on an Australian regional tour with Rüfüs Du Sol, they joined the band nationally in 2019 before supporting them throughout the United States. The same year they featured on triple j's Mix Up program for an hour long DJ set.

In October 2022, Lastlings released single "Get What You Want" via Rose Avenue Records.

Influences
The band have cited Jamie xx and Nicolas Jaar as influences.

Discography

Studio albums

Remix albums

Extended plays

Singles

As lead artist

As featured artist

Guest appearances

Remixes

Awards

AIR Awards
The Australian Independent Record Awards (known colloquially as the AIR Awards) is an annual awards night to recognise, promote and celebrate the success of Australia's Independent Music sector.

! 
|-
| 2021
| First Contact
| Best Independent Dance or Electronica Album or EP
| 
| 
|}

Queensland Music Awards
The Queensland Music Awards (previously known as Q Song Awards) are annual awards celebrating Queensland, Australia's brightest emerging artists and established legends. They commenced in 2006.

 (wins only)
|-
| 2021
| "Out of Touch" (directed by Dylan Dulcos, Rico Zhang)
| Video Award
| 
|-

References

External links
 

2015 establishments in Australia
Australian electronic music groups
Australian people of Japanese descent
Musical groups established in 2015